Alder Springs may refer to:

Alder Springs, Fresno County, California, unincorporated community
Alder Springs, Glenn County, California, unincorporated community
Alder Springs, Campbell County, Tennessee, unincorporated community
Alder Springs, Union County, Tennessee, unincorporated community